Pideli köfte is one of the best-known dishes of Turkey. 

The dish consists of köfte topped with hot tomato sauce over pieces of pita bread and generously slathered with melted sheep's milk butter and yogurt. Tomato sauce and melted butter are generally poured over the dish, at the table.

Regional Pideli Köfte styles
Manisa kebabı
Balaban kebabı
Köftender

See also

 List of kebabs

References

Culture in Bursa
Culture in Eskişehir
Culture in Manisa
Kebabs
Middle Eastern grilled meats
Turkish cuisine
Turkish words and phrases